Kasaragod may refer to:

 Kasaragod, a municipal town in Kerala
 Kasaragod district, northernmost district in the Indian state of Kerala
 Kasaragod taluk, one of the 4 Taluks in Kasaragod district
 Kasaragod (Lok Sabha constituency), a parliamentary constituency in the lower house of India's parliament
 Kasaragod (State Assembly constituency), an assembly constituency in Kerala state
 Kasaragod railway station, located in Kasaragod Town.

See also 
 Kasarkod